Pitcairnia rubronigriflora is a plant species in the genus Pitcairnia.

Cultivars
 Pitcairnia 'Beaujolais'
 Pitcairnia 'Coral Horizon'
 Pitcairnia 'Pinot Noir'

References
BSI Cultivar Registry Retrieved 11 October 2009

rubronigriflora